The Cayman Islands League is the top association football league in the Cayman Islands and was created in 1980. Despite being a league competition in CONCACAF since 1992, no team participated in the CFU Club Championship until the 2010 CFU Club Championship, where Elite SC entered. No team from the Cayman Islands has ever participated in a CONCACAF club tournament – CONCACAF Champions' Cup or CONCACAF Champions League.

Current teams
The following 10 teams are competing in the 2020–21 season. Prior to the 2020–21 season, the league had 12 teams.

Previous winners

1980–81 : Yama Sun Oil
1981–82 : Unknown.
1982–83 : Unknown.
1983–84 : St. George's
1984–85 : Mont Joly
1985–96 : Unknown.
1996–97 : George Town SC
1997–98 : Scholars International FC (West Bay)
1998–99 : George Town SC
1999–00 : Western Union FC (George Town)
2000–01 : Scholars International FC (West Bay)
2001–02 : George Town SC
2002–03 : Scholars International FC (West Bay)
2003–04 : Latinos FC
2004–05 : Western Union FC (George Town)
2005–06 : Scholars International FC (West Bay)
2006–07 : Scholars International FC (West Bay)
2007–08 : Scholars International FC (West Bay)
2008–09 : Elite SC (West Bay)
2009–10 : Scholars International FC (West Bay)
2010–11 : Elite SC (West Bay)
2011–12 : Scholars International FC (West Bay)
2012–13 : Bodden Town FC
2013–14 : Bodden Town FC
2014–15 : Scholars International FC (West Bay)
2015–16 : Scholars International FC (West Bay)
2016–17 : Bodden Town FC
2017–18 : Scholars International FC (West Bay)
2018–19 : Scholars International FC (West Bay)
2019–20 : Bodden Town FC
2020–21 : Scholars International
2021–22 : Scholars International

Best scorers

References

https://www.rsssf.org/tablesc/cayman2014.html

External links
Cayman Islands FA

 
1
Top level football leagues in the Caribbean
Sports leagues established in 1980
1980 establishments in the Cayman Islands